The Never Ending Impressions is an album by the American soul music group The Impressions which was released on January 9, 1964. It is the first album on which Impressions producer Johnny Pate worked with Curtis Mayfield. It pushed the idea of the trio as a supper-club act and included the ballad "I'm So Proud", a Top 20 hit on both the R&B and pop charts.

Track listing
All tracks composed by Curtis Mayfield; except where indicated
 "Sister Love"   
 "Little Boy Blue"    
 "Satin Doll" (Duke Ellington, Johnny Mercer, Billy Strayhorn)    
 "Girl You Don't Know Me"    
 "I Gotta Keep on Moving"   
 "You Always Hurt the One You Love" (Doris Fisher, Allan Roberts)    
 "That's What Love Will Do"    
 "I'm So Proud"     
 "September Song" (Maxwell Anderson, Kurt Weill)    
 "Lemon Tree" (Will Holt)    
 "Ten to One" 
 "A Woman Who Loves Me"

Personnel
The Impressions
Curtis Mayfield – lead vocals, guitar
Sam Gooden – backing vocals
Fred Cash – backing vocals
with:
The Funk Brothers – instrumentation
Johnny Pate – producer

Charts
USA - Album

USA - Singles

References

1964 albums
The Impressions albums
ABC Records albums